Bhavakadevi (IAST: Bhāvaka-devī; fl. 12th century or earlier), also known as Bhavadevi, was a Sanskrit poet from present-day India. Her verses are included in early medieval Sanskrit anthologies, including Vidyakara's Subhashita-ratna-kosha, Sadukti-karnamrita, and Kavindra-vachana-samuchchaya .

Example verses 
In the following verse, Bhavakadevi praises a woman's breasts using a political and military image (translation appears in Octavio Paz's In Light of India):

Alternative translation by Daniel H. H. Ingalls:

Another verse expresses the feelings of a woman who becomes disillusioned with her lover after marrying him (translation by Daniel H. H. Ingalls):

Alternative translation by R. Parthasarathy:

References

Bibliography 

 
 
 
 
 

Sanskrit-language women poets
Sanskrit poets
Indian women poets
12th-century Indian women
12th-century Indian people